Abruzzo Bodziak Architects is an architecture firm in Brooklyn, New York City, which was founded in 2009 by Emily Abruzzo and Gerald Bodziak, who first met as graduate students at the Princeton University School of Architecture. Abruzzo Bodziak’s work is known for a focus on contextually, use of light and color, and for material experimentation and graphic articulation.

The firm’s work is divided into “projects” (built works) and “investigations” (research-based initiatives and speculative proposals). The cross-pollination between the two is evident in projects such as Fitnation, a traveling exhibit that began at the New York Center for Architecture highlighting architectural projects that support health and wellness, for which Abruzzo and Bodziak served as both curators and designers. The office’s projects include civic buildings and cultural spaces, houses, installations, innovative educational spaces  and urban design. The firm’s investigations have focused on topics such as homelessness, unmeasurability in building, data-driven urban design, and new forms of housing. Projects such as “Storefront Library,” completed in 2018 for Storefront for Art and Architecture combine the firm’s interest in cultural programming with their investment in civic space.

Recognition 
 2017 Groundbreakers Award, Curbed 
 2016 Design Vanguard, Architectural Record 
 2014 Arnold W. Brunner Grant, (4D Lightful Gardens), American Institute of Architects New York  
 2013 AIANY Design Award, Merit Award, Projects (Landscape (Triptych)), American Institute of Architects New York  
 2012 AIA New Practices New York, American Institute of Architects New York 
 2010 The Architectural League Prize, Architectural League of New York

References

External links
Abruzzo Bodziak Architects website

Design companies established in 2009
Architecture firms based in New York City
2009 establishments in New York City